Georg Friedrich Wilhelm Rosen (Born Ballhorn; 24 September 1820 in Detmold, Principality of Lippe – 29 October 1891 in Detmold) was a German (Lippe/Prussian) orientalist and diplomat.

Biography

He studied in Berlin and Leipzig. From 1844, he was a dragoman at the Prussian embassy in Constantinople. From 1853 he was the Prussian consul in Jerusalem. From 1867 he was Consul General of the North German Confederation (from 1871, the German Empire) in Belgrade. In 1875, Rosen returned to Detmold, where, in May 1907, the Rosenstraße was named in his honor.

Rosen was a friend of E. A. Wallis Budge. Budge, together with his wife, spent a prolonged visit to Rosen's home in 1885.

Family
The Orientalist Friedrich August Rosen was his brother; their father, Friedrich Ballhorn-Rosen, originating from Denmark, was Chancellor of the Principality of Lippe. Georg Rosen married Serena Anna (1830−1902), a painter, and daughter of the composer Ignaz Moscheles. By her he was father of Friedrich Rosen, also diplomat and for a short time German foreign minister, and Jelka Rosen, also a painter. His namesake grandson Georg Rosen (1895–1961) was also diplomat and helped organising the Nanking Safety Zone in 1937.

Works 

 Rudimenta persica (Leipzig, 1843)
 Über die Sprache der Lazen (Lemgo, 1844)
 Ossetische Grammatik (Lemgo, 1846).
 Tuti-nameh (Leipzig, 1858, 2 vols)
 Das Haram zu Jerusalem und der Tempelplatz des Moria (Gotha, 1866)
 Geschichte der Türkei vom Sieg der Reform 1826 bis zum Pariser Traktat 1856 (Leipzig, 1866–67, 2 vols.)
 Die Balkan-Haiduken (Leipzig, 1878)
 Bulgarische Volksdichtungen, ins Deutsche übertragen (Leipzig, 1879)

References 

Notes

Bibliography
 
 Meyers Konversationslexikon 

German orientalists
German diplomats
Dragomans
People from Detmold
1821 births
1891 deaths
19th-century translators
19th-century German writers
19th-century German male writers
German male non-fiction writers